Maxwell James Dal Santo (born ) is an Australian male weightlifter, competing in the 105 kg category and representing Australia at international competitions since 2002. He participated at the 2014 Commonwealth Games in the 105 kg event.

Even though his results at the 2014 Commonwealth Games were not the best of his career, it has allowed Max to fulfill a goal he has had for 10 years. 

he has Black hair And brown eyes.

Major competitions

References

1985 births
Living people
Australian male weightlifters
Place of birth missing (living people)
Weightlifters at the 2014 Commonwealth Games
Commonwealth Games competitors for Australia
20th-century Australian people
21st-century Australian people